

Events
The Olympis Café, a dive bar in Chicago's Whiskey Row vice district, is opened by Sime Tuckhorn and quickly becomes frequented by the city's white slavery traders. 
Summer – Monk Eastman, while traveling through the Bowery, is attacked near Chatham Square by several members of the Five Points Gang. Eastman, armed only with brass knuckles and a slingshot, manages to fight them off knocking out three of the attackers before being shot twice in the stomach by the fourth member. Quickly fleeing the area, Eastman managed to walk to Gouverneur Hospital where he stayed for several weeks. Eastman refuses to speak to police about the incident however, only a week after his release, a Five Pointer was found shot to death between Grand and Chrystie Streets.

Arts and literature

Births
Joseph Rao [Joseph Cangro], drug trafficker and associate of Dutch Shultz  
August 6 – Dutch Schultz [Arthur Flegenheimer], New York Prohibition gangster

Deaths

References

Years in organized crime
Organized crime